Wooleya is a monotypic genus of flowering plants belonging to the family Aizoaceae. It only contains one known species, Wooleya farinosa. It is also in tribe Ruschieae.

It is native to the Cape Provinces in the South African Republic.

The genus name of Wooleya is in honour of Charles Hugh Frederick Wooley (1894–1969), an English naval officer, natural scientist and citrus grower. He also supplied Kirstenbosch National Botanical Garden with succulents from around South Africa. The Latin specific epithet of farinosa means
farinaceous (having a floury texture or grainy) derived from farina meaning flour.
It was first described and published in J. S. African Bot. Vol.27 on page 48 in 1960.

References

Aizoaceae
Aizoaceae genera
Taxa named by Louisa Bolus
Plants described in 1960
Flora of the Cape Provinces
Monotypic Caryophyllales genera